Voodoo Lounge Live by the Rolling Stones is a concert video, filmed at Joe Robbie Stadium in Miami, Florida on 25 November 1994 during the Voodoo Lounge Tour. The concert was broadcast as a pay-per-view special. Of the 27 songs played, 17 were released on the home video.

Voodoo Lounge Live was first released on VHS in late 1995 and then on DVD in 1998. An extended and re-edited version, featuring the entire concert, was released on DVD/CD, Blu-ray/CD sets and as audio and video digital downloads, as Voodoo Lounge Uncut, on 16 November 2018.

Track listing
 Opening, host Whoopi Goldberg 
 "Not Fade Away"
 "Tumbling Dice"
 "You Got Me Rocking"
 "(I Can't Get No) Satisfaction"
 "Angie"
 "Sweet Virginia"
 "It's All Over Now"
 "Stop Breaking Down" with Robert Cray
 "Who Do You Love?" with Bo Diddley
 "Miss You"
 Introductions
 "Honky Tonk Women"
 "The Worst"
 "Sympathy for the Devil"
 "Start Me Up"
 "It's Only Rock 'n Roll (But I Like It)"
 "Brown Sugar"
 "Jumpin' Jack Flash"

Setlist
 "Not Fade Away"
 "Tumbling Dice"
 "You Got Me Rocking"
 "Rocks Off"
 "Sparks Will Fly"
 "Live With Me"
 "Satisfaction"
 "Beast of Burden"
 "Angie"
 "Dead Flowers"
 "Sweet Virginia"
 "Doo Doo Doo Doo Doo"
 "It's All Over Now"
 "Stop Breaking Down"
 "Who Do You Love"
 "I Go Wild"
 "Miss You"
 "Honky Tonk Women"
 "Before They Make Me Run"
 "The Worst"
 "Sympathy for the Devil"
 "Monkey Man"
 "Street Fighting Man"
 "Start Me Up"
 "It's Only Rock'n Roll (But I Like It)"
 "Brown Sugar"
 "Jumpin' Jack Flash"

Official souvenir video 
A VHS-video called "Live Voodoo Lounge", with "Official Souvenir Video" stated on its back cover, was available for sale and order during the Voodoo Lounge Tour. Filmed at Giants Stadium in East Rutherford, New Jersey on 14 August 1994.

Track listing 
 Introduction
 "Not Fade Away"
 "Tumbling Dice"
 "You Got Me Rocking"
 "Shattered"
 "Rocks Off"
 "Sparks Will Fly"
 "(I Can't Get No) Satisfaction"
 "Out of Tears"
 "Miss You"
 Band introductions
 "Honky Tonk Women"
 "The Worst"
 "Start Me Up"
 "It's Only Rock 'n Roll (But I Like It)"
 "Street Fighting Man"
 "Brown Sugar"
 "Jumpin' Jack Flash"

Personnel
The Rolling Stones
Mick Jagger – lead vocals, guitar, harmonica
Keith Richards – guitar, vocals
Ronnie Wood – guitar
Charlie Watts – drums

Additional musicians
Darryl Jones – bass
Chuck Leavell – keyboards
Bobby Keys – saxophone
Lisa Fischer – backing vocals
Bernard Fowler – backing vocals, percussion

New West Horns
Andy Snitzer – saxophone
Michael Davis – trombone
Kent Smith – trumpet

Special guests
Robert Cray – vocals, guitar
Bo Diddley – vocals, guitar
Sheryl Crow – vocals

Other
Whoopi Goldberg – host
David Mallet – director

Certifications

References

1994 video albums
1995 live albums
1995 video albums
2018 live albums
2018 video albums
Eagle Rock Entertainment live albums
Eagle Rock Entertainment video albums
Live video albums
The Rolling Stones video albums
The Rolling Stones live albums
Music videos directed by David Mallet (director)